Rickey Dixon (December 26, 1966 – August 1, 2020) was an American professional football player who was a safety in the National Football League (NFL). He played college football for the Oklahoma Sooners. Dixon was selected by the Cincinnati Bengals in the first round of the 1988 NFL draft with the fifth overall pick. He played five seasons with the Bengals and one for the Los Angeles Raiders.

College football career
A standout defensive back at Wilmer-Hutchins High School in Dallas, Dixon came to Norman to play for the Sooners in 1984. He played in the 1985, 1986, 1987, and 1988 Orange Bowls, in two National Championship games, and was a key figure in Oklahoma's 1985 National Championship win over Penn State in the 1986 Orange Bowl.

A consensus All-American in 1987, Dixon was the first Sooner to win the Jim Thorpe Award, given to the top defensive back in the country. He shared the Award with Miami's Bennie Blades.  He won all-conference honors in 1986 and 1987.

The defining game of Dixon's collegiate career was the 1987 contest against the Nebraska Cornhuskers.  Hyped as the "Game of the Century II", playing on the moniker given to the 1971 contest between Oklahoma and Nebraska, Nebraska was favored at home in Lincoln, boasting the #1 offense in the country.

The Sooners came in ranked #2 in the nation, and sporting the #1 defense in the country.  Nebraska quarterback Steve Taylor came into the game boasting that the Sooners could not compete against the Cornhuskers. It was Dixon's two interceptions of Taylor in the game (one to set up a short touchdown drive, and one late in the fourth quarter to seal the win) that put the Cornhuskers away and guaranteed Oklahoma a shot at the Miami Hurricanes in the 1988 Orange Bowl. In the Orange Bowl, Dixon had another key interception to set up a Sooner touchdown drive in a game that Miami eventually won, 20-14.

Dixon finished his career with 170 total tackles and 17 interceptions (second only to Darrell Royal for the school record). During his senior year, he had nine interceptions for 232 yards which remain school records for the Sooners.

Career college statistics

NFL career and later work
The Cincinnati Bengals selected Dixon with the fifth pick of the 1988 NFL Draft.

He had one interception during his first season with the Bengals. Although relegated to special teams, Dixon played in Super Bowl XXIII against the San Francisco 49ers. Dixon was traded to the Los Angeles Raiders prior to the 1993 season.

After retiring from the NFL, Dixon coached for W.T White High School and Paul Quinn College, and retired from being a physical education teacher at Red Oak High School in Red Oak, Texas in May 2007. Dixon was diagnosed with amyotrophic lateral sclerosis in 2013.

Dixon was elected to the College Football Hall of Fame in 2019 

Dixon died on August 1, 2020 at the age of 53 in DeSoto, Texas due to complications from Amyotrophic lateral sclerosis.

* Tackle data unavailable before 2001

References

External links 
Rickey Dixon: All-American at SoonerSports.com
Rickey Dixon – Jim Thorpe Award Winners at SoonerSports.com
Rickey Dixon Database Football

1966 births
2020 deaths
All-American college football players
American football cornerbacks
American football safeties
Cincinnati Bengals players
Los Angeles Raiders players
Oklahoma Sooners football players
Neurological disease deaths in Texas
Deaths from motor neuron disease
Players of American football from Dallas